Graham Gipson (Graham Chater Gipson; born 21 May 1932) was an Australian athlete who competed mainly in the 400 metres.

He competed for Australia in the 1956 Summer Olympics held in Melbourne in the 4 × 400 metre relay where he won the silver medal with his teammates Leon Gregory, David Lean and Kevan Gosper.  He also won the 440 yards at the 1953 National Championships and achieved five second places and third place in 110 yard, 220 yard and 440 yard races at National Championships between 1953 and 1958.

References 

1932 births
Australian male sprinters
Olympic silver medalists for Australia
Athletes (track and field) at the 1956 Summer Olympics
Olympic athletes of Australia
Living people
Medalists at the 1956 Summer Olympics
Olympic silver medalists in athletics (track and field)